The Flood Control Act of 1941 was an Act of the United States Congress signed into law by US President Franklin Roosevelt that authorized civil engineering projects such as dams, levees, dikes, and other flood control measures through the United States Army Corps of Engineers and other Federal agencies. It is one of a number of Flood Control Acts that is passed nearly annually by the US Congress.

Projects

Dams
 Kinzua Dam (begun in 1960, completed in 1965)
 Fort Gibson Dam (begun in 1941, completed in 1949)
 Allatoona Dam (begun in 1946, completed in 1950)

Stormwater control
 Construction of mandatory storm drains and flood control channels throughout the city of Los Angeles in the wake of the Los Angeles Flood of 1938.

See also
Water Resources Development Act
Rivers and Harbors Act 
for related legislation which sometime also implement flood control provisions.

1941 in the environment
1941 in American law
1941